In Thailand, the regent is a person who exercises the official functions of a monarch of Thailand when the monarch is incapable of functioning or during a period of interregnum.

Appointment

By Old Royal Customs
Ancient custom dictates that the heir to the last king rule only as a regent and not as a king until he is officially consecrated. An unconsecrated king is not considered qualified to carry out the divine and priestly function of a Devarāja (or God-king). Until the coronation rites are completed the new king must exclude the prefix Phrabat (พระบาท) from his royal title, he cannot enact a royal command, nor sit under the nine-tiered umbrella (he must make do with only seven tiers). As a result, it was customary for a king to go through the coronation ceremonies as soon as he had succeeded to the throne.

In Modern Era

Incapacity of monarch

In accordance with the 2017 constitution, if the monarch is to leave the country or is unable to perform his duties for whatever reason, he may or may not appoint any regent or council of regency. If he does make an appointment, the president of the National Assembly of Thailand will countersign the appointment.

If the monarch does not or cannot appoint any regent due to his minority or for any other reason and the Privy Council of Thailand finds the regency is necessary, the Privy Council will nominate a regent or council of regency to the president of the National Assembly for further appointment in the name of the monarch. The nominees are required to be those having been picked beforehand by the monarch and they must be nominated in accordance with the order of precedence designated beforehand by the monarch also.

Until a regent or council of regency is appointed, the president of the Privy Council will serve as the regent ad interim.

The constitution also requires an appointed regent to take the following oath of office amongst the National Assembly before assuming office:

Formerly, the law required regency during the incapacity of the monarch. In January 2017, King Rama X made an unprecedented move to change a draft constitution (later promulgated as the 2017 constitution) by removing the need for the monarch to appoint any regent in such an event, despite the draft having already been approved in a referendum.

Interregnum

In accordance with the 2017 constitution, when the throne becomes vacant, the president of the Privy Council of Thailand will act as the regent ad interim until a monarch is installed.

But if the vacancy takes place when there already is a regent, appointed by the previous monarch or by the president of the National Assembly due to the monarch's incapacity, that regent will continue to function until a monarch is enthroned. If the appointed regent is unable to function, the president of the Privy Council will also serve as the regent ad interim.

Flag
The regent is given an official flag by the Flag Act 1979. It is a white square flag with a shield of the national flag at the centre, topped by the mythological bird garuda, which is the national emblem of Thailand.

List of regents

Fourth Reign

Fifth Reign

Sixth Reign

Seventh Reign

Eighth Reign

Ninth Reign

Tenth Reign

See also

Monarchy of Thailand
List of Thai Monarchs
List of Thai royal consorts
Crown Prince of Thailand
Regent
List of regents
Constitution of Thailand

References

 
Thailand
Thailand
Heads of state of Thailand
Regents
Regents
Thailand